Miss World 2011, the 61st edition of the Miss World pageant, was held on 6 November 2011 at the Earls Court Two in London, United Kingdom. As part of the events, the contestants also travelled to Edinburgh, Scotland between 23 and 27 October. Alexandria Mills of the United States crowned her successor Ivian Sarcos of Venezuela at the end of the event, she is the sixth Venezuelan woman to win Miss World - currently tied with India for the most wins in the competition's history. Although over 120 delegates were expected to compete, problems regarding the timely acquisition of visas prevented several candidates from participating, thus reducing the final number to 113. Miss World 2011 was viewed by over 1 billion people worldwide.

Results

Placements

Continental Queens of Beauty

Contestants
Contestants from 113 countries participated in Miss World 2011.

Judges
Miss World 2011 contestants were evaluated by a panel of judges.

 Julia Morley – Chairwoman of the Miss World Organization 
 Denise Perrier – Miss World 1953 from France
 Antigone Costanda – Miss World 1954 from Egypt
 Cindy Breakspeare – Miss World 1976 from Jamaica
 Linda Pétursdóttir – Miss World 1988 from Iceland
 Agbani Darego – Miss World 2001 from Nigeria
 Zhang Zilin – Miss World 2007 from China
 Ksenia Sukhinova – Miss World 2008 from Russia
 Kaiane Aldorino – Miss World 2009 from Gibraltar
 Krish Naidoo – Miss World International Ambassador
 Mike Dixon – Musical Director
 George Kotsiopoulos – Fashion Stylist & Editor
 Warren Batchelor – Miss World Executive Producer
 Andrew Minarik – Make-Up Artist & Hairdresser

Notes

Debuts

Returns

Last competed in 1995:
 
Last competed in 1996:
 
 
Last competed in 2005
 
Last competed in 2008:
 
Last competed in 2009:

Withdrawals

Designations
  – Isi Topçiu-Ulaj was appointed to represent Albania, she was the 3rd runner-up at the Miss Albania 2010 pageant.
  – Anastasiya Kharlanava was appointed to represent Belarus, after no national pageant was held because the Miss Belarus pageant is a bi-annual event. It was last time held in 2010. Anastasiya was the 2nd runner-up at the Miss Belarus 2010 pageant.
  – Monifa Jansen was appointed as Senorita Kòrsou World 2011 after she wasn't allowed to compete at Miss Universe 2011 because she didn't meet the age minimum requirement.
  – Donia Hamed was appointed to represent Egypt after no national pageant was held due to the political crisis. Donia was previously Miss Universe Egypt 2010.
  – Eleni Miariti was appointed to represent Greece, after no national pageant was held due to the financial crisis. She was chosen among the group of contestants that took part of the Miss World Greece 2011 casting call held on 8 October.
  – Lourdes Figueroa was appointed to represent Guatemala. She was Miss Guatemala 2009 and delegate at Miss Universe 2009
  – Buyankhishig Unurbayar.
  – Darling Trujillo was appointed "Miss Mundo Nicaragua 2011" after the new national director Denis Davila, was awarded the license of Miss World in Nicaragua.
  – Erin Cummins was appointed to represent United States by Elite Models, license holders for Miss World in the United States. Cummins works for Elite Models as a professional model.
  – Esonica Veira was appointed to represent US Virgin Islands, she was the 1st runner-up at the Miss Universe US Virgin Islands 2011 pageant.
  – Victoria Phạm Thúy Vy was appointed to represent Vietnam after Miss Vietnam 2010 Đặng Thị Ngọc Hân refused to compete in the competitiom, she is the 2nd runner-up of Miss Vietnam World 2010.

Replacements
  – Julia Hofer replaced the original winner of Miss Austria 2011 pageant, Carmen Stamboli, because Carmen was overage and didn't meet the age requirements stipulated by Miss World organisation. Julia was the 1st runner-up at the national pageant.
  – Miss Hong Kong 2011 winner Rebecca Zhu was replaced by the 1st runner-up Hyman Chu, Because Rebecca was too busy to star in her first TV Drama ever during Miss World 2011.
  – Joelle Nagapen replaced Laetitia Darche due to Laetitia's participation at the Miss Intercontinental 2011 pageant. Joelle was the 1st runner-up at the Miss Mauritius 2010 pageant.
  – Cynthia de la Vega was replaced by Gabriela Palacio after being dethroned for failing to fulfill her duties as Miss World Mexico.

References

External links
 Pageantopolis – Miss World 2011

Miss World
2011 beauty pageants
2011 in London
Beauty pageants in the United Kingdom
November 2011 events in the United Kingdom